Santa Maria Incoronata or Holy Mary Crowned is an Italian of veneration of the Virgin as Queen. In Italy it can refer to:
Santa Maria Incoronata, Milan
Santa Maria Incoronata, Naples